This is a list of United States military installations in Panama, all of which fall within the former Canal zone. The U.S. military installations in Panama were turned over to local authorities by 1999.

Transition phases
In 1903, the Hay–Bunau-Varilla Treaty was signed between Panama and the United States. It created the Panama Canal Zone as a U.S. governed region, and allowed the U.S. to build the Panama Canal. In 1977, the Panama Canal Treaty (also called Torrijos–Carter Treaties) was signed by Commander of Panama's National Guard, General Omar Torrijos and U.S. President Jimmy Carter. Over time, it would replace and absolve the 1903 treaty. 
 1 October 1979, the Panama Canal Zone was abolished. All unused area (mainly forest) was transferred to Panama. Also some non-military constructions, like hospitals and schools, were transferred to Panama.
 Between 1979 and 31 December 1999 U.S. transferred all military areas and constructions to Panama. Formal U.S. presence was ended by 2000. In total  with 5,237 buildings were handed over.  Their estimated value was some $4 billion US$.
 After the United States invasion of Panama in 1989, some installations were reactivated by the U.S. Still, these were disestablished by 2000.

List

See also
 :Category:Panama Canal Zone Townships
Naval Base Panama Canal Zone

References

External links
 http://william_h_ormsbee.tripod.com/

Military, List of former United States military installations in Panama